Donald Davidson (19 September 1904 – 17 July 1985) was a South African cricketer. He played in ten first-class matches from 1924/25 to 1936/37.

References

External links
 

1904 births
1985 deaths
South African cricketers
Border cricketers
Eastern Province cricketers
Griqualand West cricketers
Cricketers from Cape Town